The 2021 WNBA Finals, officially the WNBA Finals 2021 presented by YouTube TV for sponsorship reasons, was the best-of-five championship series for the 2021 season of the Women's National Basketball Association (WNBA).  The finals featured the fifth-seeded Phoenix Mercury facing off against the sixth-seeded Chicago Sky, a rematch of the 2014 Finals. The Sky defeated the Mercury in 4 games, winning their first WNBA Championship, as well as Chicago's first professional basketball championship since 1998.

Road to the Finals

Standings

Playoffs

Summary

This finals was only the second time since the WNBA switched playoff formats in 2016 that two teams from different conferences met in the finals.  The previous time was in 2018, when the Washington Mystics faced off against the Seattle Storm.  This finals is also the first time since the format switch where the number one seed did not make the finals. The finals was the first time since the format switch that a team that was not the #1 or #2 seed won the championship.  Additionally, the match up between the Mercury and Sky was be a rematch of the 2014 WNBA Finals.

The Phoenix Mercury qualified for the finals after finishing fifth in the regular season standings.  They defeated the New York Liberty in the First Round, the defending champions Seattle Storm in the Second Round, and the second seeded Las Vegas Aces 3–2 in the Semifinals.  The Mercury are the third non-top two seed to make the finals.

The Chicago Sky qualified for the finals after finishing sixth in the regular season standings.  They defeated the Dallas Wings in the First Round, the Minnesota Lynx in the Second Round, and the top seeded Connecticut Sun 3–1 in the Semifinals.  The Sky are only the second non-top two seed to make the finals.  The Mystics in 2018 were the third seed.  The sixth-seeded Sky are also the lowest seed to make the finals under the new playoff format.  The Sky are the third team to qualify for the finals after having a regular season record of .500 or lower.  This was second finals appearance in franchise history for the Sky, with the other coming in 2014.

During the regular season, the teams faced off three times, with the Mercury winning all three games.

Game 1

The series began in Phoenix, in front of a bumper crowd of over 10,000 fans.  The Mercury gave the fans something to cheer, winning the first quarter by five points, 25–20.  However, the Sky came roaring back in the second quarter to quiet the crowd.  The Sky won the quarter by sixteen points, 26–10, and took an eleven-point lead into half time.  Quarter three was tightly contested, but the Mercury could not reduce the deficit.  The Sky won the quarter by two points, 28–26, and took a thirteen-point lead into the final period.  The Sky also won the final quarter by a point, 17–16, and therefore the game, by a total of fourteen points.

The Sky were led by Kahleah Copper who scored 21 points and recorded 10 rebounds to complete a double-double.  Guard Courtney Vandersloot also had a double-double, with 12 points and 11 assists.  Allie Quigley, Candace Parker, Stefanie Dolson, and Azurá Stevens all scored in double figures for the Sky.  However, no other Sky players scored in the game.  The Mercury were led by Brittney Griner with 20 points, Diana Taurasi with 17, and Skylar Diggins-Smith with 15.

Game 2

Over 13,000 fans were in attendance for Game 2 in Phoenix, but the home team couldn't take advantage of the home crowd in the first quarter.  The Sky took the opening period by six points, 26–20.  However, the Mercury came back in the second and won the quarter by six points, 20–14.  The game was tied going into halftime, and the Sky came out strong in the third quarter and won by six points, 23–17.  The Mercury won the fourth quarter by six points, 22–16 to force overtime.  The six point trend was broken as the Mercury won the overtime period by five points, 12–7.

The Mercury had four players score in double figures, led by Brittney Griner with 29 points.  Diana Taurasi scored 20 points, Skylar Diggins-Smith added 13 points, and Shey Peddy added 10 points from the bench.  The Sky also had four players score in double figures, led by Courtney Vandersloot with 20 points.  Allie Quigley scored 19 points, Kahleah Copper scored 15, and Candace Parker rounded out the double digit scorers with 13 points.  Five players also recorded nine rebounds in the game, leaving three players one rebound shy of a double-double.

Game 3

The series moved to Chicago for Game Three and the Sky took advantage to start the game, winning the first quarter by nine points, 20–11.  The Sky continued their dominance into the second quarter, winning the quarter by thirteen points, 26–13.  The Sky then took a twenty two point lead into halftime.  The halftime lead tied the largest ever in the WNBA Finals.  With such a big lead, the Sky did not let up, winning the third quarter by two points and the fourth quarter by twelve points to win the game by thirty six points.

The Sky had three players score in double digits, led by Kahleah Copper with 22 points.  Candace Parker scored 13 and Diamond DeShields added 11 off the bench.  Courtney Vandersloot recorded 10 assists.  The Mercury only had one player score in double digits, Brittney Griner with 16 points.

Game 4 

Game four began with a close first quarter that Phoenix won by three points, 28–25.  The Mercury kept their momentum going and won the second quarter by four points, 16–12, to take a seven point lead into half time.  They expanded on that lead by winning the third quarter by two points, 19–17.  However, the Sky would make a comeback in the fourth quarter, winning the quarter by fifteen points to erase the Mercury's nine point lead.  The explosive quarter saw the Sky win the game by six points, and secure their first WNBA Title.

The Sky had four players score in double digits, led by Allie Quigley who scored 26 points.  Candace Parker added 16 points, and both Kahleah Copper and Courtney Vandersloot scored 10 points to round out the double digit scorers.  Parker and Vandersloot also recorded double-doubles.  Parker by virtue of recording 13 rebounds and Vandersloot by way of 15 assists.  The Mercury had three players score in double digits, led by Brittney Griner with 28 points.  Diana Taurasi and Skylar Diggins-Smith both scored 16 points to round out the double digit scorers.

Following their victory, the city of Chicago held a huge parade to celebrate.

Team Rosters

References

External links
WNBA Playoffs Home

Women's National Basketball Association Finals
Finals
WNBA Finals
Chicago Sky
Phoenix Mercury
Basketball competitions in Chicago
Basketball competitions in Phoenix, Arizona